Choices: The Movie is a drama film produced by the director Gil Green was released on November 6, 2001. The film stars Isley Nicole Melton as well as Hypnotize Minds artists DJ Paul, Juicy J, Project Pat, and La Chat. Its plot concerns a recently released from prison ex-con struggling to stay on the right track. The movie would be followed in 2005 by a sequel entitled Choices II: The Setup.

See also
Choices: The Album

References

External links 
 

2001 direct-to-video films
2001 films
Hood films
American crime drama films
Films set in Memphis, Tennessee
African-American films
2001 crime drama films
2000s hip hop films
Three 6 Mafia
American independent films
2000s American films